South Solitary is a 2010 Australian romance film set on South Solitary Island and directed by Shirley Barrett.

Plot

Meredith Appleton (Miranda Otto) arrives on South Solitary island with her elderly uncle George Wadsworth (Barry Otto). Her uncle has been sent as the new Head Lighthouse Keeper after the suicide of the last one. Her uncle is shown to be a gruff man very critical of the slightest disorder.  Meredith meets the local girl Nettie (Annie Martin), whom she asks to care for her lamb. She then meets the mother, Alma Stanley (Essie Davis) and her two sons, Tom (Reef Ireland) and Robbie (Benson Adams). The father, Harry Stanley (Rohan Nichol) takes George for a tour of inspection where George disapproves of the state of loose animals, the absence of lighthouse keeper Jack Fleet (Marton Csokas), and a previous history of lighthouse outages.

The first night, as Meredith is preparing tea for her uncle, she hears baby birds chirping in the stovepipe so she douses the fire and is not able to prepare hot tea for her uncle. Jack Fleet has a panic attack on his watch, brought on by his war trauma. Nettie introduces Meredith to the unreliable emergency message system using homing pigeons. When Nettie tries to send a routine message that all is well on South Solitary the birds return to their coop thus rendering the system useless. While having afternoon tea with Alma, Meredith reveals she is unable to give birth to the unsympathetic mother. She lost her fiancé in the war, then became pregnant through an affair with a married man, but complications meant her womb was removed. Making friends with South Solitary’s strange residents is hard for Meredith who finds the isolation difficult. Harry visits her during her bath, and seduces her. Sent to fetch her dad, Nettie sees Meredith and Harry in bed together and tells her mother who tells George, and the family is next seen quitting the island on the next passing ship.

While pushing up a store of supplies from the beach without Stanley to help, George overly exerts himself, becomes very ill with a heart attack and dies. Jack must keep solitary watch as there is no one else and proves himself a sensitive and capable keeper. Together the pair bury George and provide a eulogy for him. A whole gale quickly forms stranding Meredith at the lighthouse with Fleet for several days during which she learns how to turn the light and the Flag semaphore system and gets to know him. She conveys her sense of loneliness to Jack and her desire for a sense of permanence, with more conversation than Jack is used to, causing him to have a panic attack with hallucinations of a ship in distress, so that he runs off into the wilderness. Covering the island, Meredith finds her lost lamb which Jack helps her to recover. Meanwhile Jack sees a ship in the distance and signals for it to pick up Meredith who wants to stay. She begs him not to send her away, but he finds it too stressful having close company and refuses. As she leaves they kiss, and arrange to keep in touch, even that Jack will visit when he next has leave. Meredith looks out for him from the water then catches sight of the semaphore message he has displayed; she is seen smiling as she draws away from South Solitary.

Cast
Miranda Otto ... Meredith Appleton
Marton Csokas ... Jake Fleet
Rohan Nichol ... Harry Stanley
Essie Davis ... Alma Stanley
Barry Otto ... George Wadsworth
Annie Martin ... Nettie Stanley

Reviews
Rotten Tomatoes gave the film a 71% with a rating of 5.6 out of 10. Out of 17 reviews counted, 12 gave it a positive review and 6 gave it a negative review.

References

External links

2010 films
2010 romance films
Films directed by Shirley Barrett
Australian romance films
2010s English-language films